Heliosia monosticta is a moth of the family Erebidae. It was described by George Hampson in 1900. It is found on Borneo. The habitat consists of lowland forests, dry heath forests and coastal scrubs.

References

 

Nudariina
Moths described in 1900